SS John W. Griffiths was a Liberty ship built in the United States during World War II. She was named after John W. Griffiths, a naval architect who was influential in his design of clipper ships.

Construction
John W. Griffiths was laid down on 13 December 1943, under a Maritime Commission (MARCOM) contract, MC hull 1548, by J.A. Jones Construction, Panama City, Florida; she was launched on 9 February 1944.

History
She was allocated to Blidberg & Rothchild Co., Inc., on 25 March 1944. On 19 May 1946, she was laid up in the National Defense Reserve Fleet, in the James River Group, in Lee Hall, Virginia. On 7 January 1947, she was transferred to the Italian Government, which in turn sold her to Corrado Socite di Navigazione, Genoa, Italy, for $544,506, on 10 January 1947. She was renamed Dino. In 1963, she was sold to Sicilarma Societe di Navigazione per Azioni, Genoa, and renamed Imera. She was scrapped in Spezia in 1965.

See also

Convoy UGS-40

References

Bibliography

 
 
 
 
 

 

Liberty ships
Ships built in Panama City, Florida
1944 ships
James River Reserve Fleet
Liberty ships transferred to Italy